Võ Hoàng Quảng (born 2 May 1987) is a Vietnamese footballer who plays as a right back for V.League 1 club SHB Đà Nẵng  and the Vietnam national football team.

References 

1987 births
Living people
Vietnamese footballers
Association football defenders
V.League 1 players
SHB Da Nang FC players
People from Da Nang
Vietnam international footballers
Footballers at the 2010 Asian Games
Asian Games competitors for Vietnam